Thomas Talbot may refer to:

Politicians
 Thomas Talbot (MP for Lancashire) (died 1558), English politician
 Thomas Talbot (MP for Castle Rising), represented Castle Rising (1640)
 Thomas Talbot (MP for Thirsk), represented Thirsk (1659)
 Thomas Talbot (Upper Canada) (1771–1853), member of the Legislative Council of Upper Canada and settler of the Talbot Settlement
 Thomas Talbot (Newfoundland politician) (1818–1901), educator and politician in Newfoundland
 Thomas Talbot (Massachusetts politician) (1818–1885), governor of Massachusetts

Others

 Thomas Talbot (died 1487) (c. 1439–1487), landowner and judge in Ireland
 Thomas Talbot, 2nd Viscount Lisle (1443–1470), English nobleman
 Thomas Talbot (antiquary) (fl. 1580), English antiquary
 Thomas Talbot (bishop) (1727–1795), Roman Catholic bishop
 Thomas Talbot (bottler) (1819–1891), beverage bottler of Gloucester
 Thomas W. Talbot (1849–1892), American machinist and trade unionist

See also
 Thomas Talbott, philosopher